Anton Glovatsky (born August 6, 1988) is a Russian professional ice hockey winger currently playing for Buran Voronezh in the VHL. He has previously played in the Kontinental Hockey League (KHL) with Metallurg Magnitogorsk, Atlant Moscow Oblast and Traktor Chelyabinsk.

References

External links

1988 births
Living people
Atlant Moscow Oblast players
Buran Voronezh players
Chelmet Chelyabinsk players
Krylya Sovetov Moscow players
Metallurg Magnitogorsk players
Metallurg Novokuznetsk players
Sokol Krasnoyarsk players
Titan Klin players
Traktor Chelyabinsk players
Russian ice hockey right wingers
People from Magnitogorsk
Sportspeople from Chelyabinsk Oblast